The Pine Hills, top elevation  at Buck Mountain, are a small mountain range east of Miles City, Montana in Custer County, Montana. It is located along highway MT-12. As the name implies, these lush pine-covered hills are known for their isolation, as the surrounding plains in all directions are treeless.

Geography
There are also several ranges of buttes in nearby areas, and some of these are of higher elevation than the Pine Hills, however these are not associated with the range.

Ecology
The Pine Hills are mostly covered with lush sage and stands of Rocky Mountain ponderosa pine woodland. Many of these are relict stands from wetter times. The climate in this range is similar to the rest of Eastern Montana, hot, wet summers and cold, dry winters.

Geology
As the Pine Hills are an old, worn-down mountain range, there are examples of old rock, such as at Strawberry Hill which has sandstone near its summit.

Tourism
There is a single-cabin lodge located in the range named the Miles City Retreat at Rolf Ranch.

In addition, a primitive camping site is located in the Strawberry Hill Recreation Area, with no services.

See also
 List of mountain ranges in Montana

References

Mountain ranges of Montana
Landforms of Custer County, Montana